Esplanade Park is a park located at the Esplanade area within the Downtown Core district of Singapore.

History
Built in 1943 when Singapore was ruled by Japan, the Esplanade Park is one of the oldest parks in Singapore. The park was redeveloped in 1991. Many historical landmarks are located at the Esplanade Park, including Queen Elizabeth Walk, the former Indian National Army Monument site, The Cenotaph (completed in 1922), Tan Kim Seng Fountain (moved here in 1925 from Fullerton Square), and the Lim Bo Seng Memorial (which was unveiled in 1954).

The Esplanade Park is bounded by Connaught Drive, Stamford Road, Esplanade Drive and the mouth of the Singapore River.

In popular culture
The park is featured in HBO series Westworld, as part of the third season.

See also
Esplanade Bridge
Esplanade – Theatres on the Bay
List of parks in Singapore

References
.

Notes

External links

Esplanade Park at National Parks Board

1943 establishments in Singapore
Downtown Core (Singapore)
Parks in Singapore